Joan Brossa (19 January 1919 – 30 December 1998) was a Catalan poet, playwright, graphic designer and visual artist. He wrote only in the Catalan language.

He was one of the founders of both the group and the publication known as Dau-al-Set (1948) and one of the leading early proponents of visual poetry in Catalan literature. Although he was in the vanguard of the post-war poets, He also wrote hundreds of formally perfect sonnets, sapphic odes and sestinas as well as thousands of free and direct poems. His creative work embraced every aspect of the arts: cinema, theatre (more than 360 pieces), music, cabaret, the para-theatrical arts, magic and the circus.

Life and work
For him, expression had priority over content, and he managed to give his poetry the appearance of plays on words. His lyrical work is connected with the theatre while the totality of his literature (more of 80 books, all written in the Catalan language) is impregnated with the theatrical dimension as he always employed a broad and interdisciplinary vision of culture, the arts in general and the performance arts in particular.  This vision was expressed in his literary and visual works which often appeared as satirical, cutting, ironic and critical or, on other occasions, irreverent yet playful. In the latter years of his creative life, he received a number of awards such as the National Prize for the Visual Arts (1992), the National Theatre Prize (1998) and the UNESCO Picasso Medal. He has been posthumously awarded doctorate honoris causa from the Universitat Autònoma de Barcelona (1999). He was a member and then Honorary Member of the Associació d'Escriptors en Llengua Catalana (Association of Catalan Language Writers). His visual poetry (poesia plàstica), obviously placed beyond all linguistic borders, is recognized as a reference the world over.

He collaborated in the foundation of the Espai Escenic Joan Brossa (The Joan Brossa Theatrical Space) in the Born district of Barcelona, this being the initiative of the theatre director and actor Hermann Bonnín and the magician Hausson, who continued along the theatrical lines espoused by Brossa.

Dau al Set
Members of Dau-al-Set included:
 Joan Brossa
 Antoni Tàpies
 Joan Ponç
 Arnau Puig
 Modest Cuixart
 Joan-Josep Tharrats
 Juan-Eduardo Cirlot

Brossa's sculptural typography in Barcelona is featured in Eye magazine (No. 37, Vol. 10, Autumn 2000) along with the work of Josep Maria Subirachs.

Gallery

See also

Espai Escènic Joan Brossa

Notes

External links 

Archivio Conz

Page on Joan Brossa, in the AELC . AELC, Association of Writers in Catalan Language, of which Brossa was an honorary member.
Works of Joan Brossa   Full and updated lists of his published essential works, his complementary editions, catalogues of his exhibitions and translations of his works in other languages.
Bibliography on Joan Brossa  .  A very complete site.
Virtual Exhibition "Els entra-i-surts de Brossa" . Interactive website edited by lletrA, Catalan Literature Online (Open University of Catalonia and Fundació Joan Brossa).
English translations of Brossa's The Poet Finds a Theme and Time
Private website Joan Brossa.org
Joan Brossa work website

1919 births
1998 deaths
Dau al Set
Catalan-language poets
Artists from Catalonia
20th-century Spanish poets
Visual poets